Telegraph Melts is the twelfth album and first release of 1986 by musician Jandek. It was released as Corwood Industries #0750.

Track listing

References

External links
Seth Tisue's Telegraph Melts review

Jandek albums
Corwood Industries albums
1986 albums